Hyphessobrycon balbus is a South American tetra species native to the headwaters of the Paraná River basin.

Etymology
Hyphessobrycon comes from the Greek word hyphesson, meaning “smaller” or “of lesser stature” and brycon, meaning “to bite”, together meaning “smaller” or “lesser bite”. Balbus is a Latin word meaning “ shuttering”, referring to its incomplete lateral line.

Description
Hyphessobrycon balbus is silvery gold in color. It can reach lengths of five to six centimeters. It is similar to the Congo tetra (Phenacogrammus interruptus) in shape and size.

Characidae
Fish of South America
Tetras
Taxa named by George S. Myers
Fish described in 1927